Josefpoeltia is a genus of lichen-forming fungi in the family Teloschistaceae. It has three species. The genus was circumscribed in 1997 by lichenologists Sergey Kondratyuk and Ingvar Kärnefelt, with J. boliviensis assigned as the type species. The genus name honours lichenologist Josef Poelt, (1924-1995) who was a German-Austrian botanist (Bryology, Mycology and Lichenology) and was Professor of Systematic Botany at the Free University of Berlin in 1965.

Species
Josefpoeltia boliviensis 
Josefpoeltia parva 
Josefpoeltia sorediosa

References

Teloschistales
Lichen genera
Teloschistales genera
Taxa named by Ingvar Kärnefelt
Taxa described in 1997
Taxa named by Sergey Kondratyuk